The Groundwork was a privately held technology firm, run by Michael Slaby, that was formed in June 2014. Campaign finance disclosures revealed that Hillary Clinton's presidential campaign was a client of the Groundwork. Most of the Groundwork's employees are back-end software developers with experience at tech firms like Netflix, DreamHost, Zalando, and Google.

The Groundwork is responsible for the "critical functions of modern campaigning" by using technological resources to consume digital data about voters, and then developing the technological means to assist the Hillary Clinton presidential campaign target these voters for fundraising, advertising, outreach. It is a customer relationship management system for future voters."

References

Consulting firms of the United States
Hillary Clinton 2016 presidential campaign
Big data
Data management
Forecasting
Transaction processing
Government by algorithm